Mariusz Pawełek  (born 17 March 1981) is a Polish footballer who plays as a goalkeeper for Silesia Lubomia. He also serves as a goalkeeping coach for I liga club GKS Jastrzębie.

Club career
On 26 September 2017 Pawełek was signed to Jagiellonia Białystok for the rest of the season to fill in for injured Damian Węglarz. In 2021, he ended his professional football career. On 10 March 2022, he rejoined his childhood club Silesia Lubomia, playing in the Polish sixth division.

Managerial career
Pawełek was appointed goalkeeping coach of GKS Jastrzębie on 23 December 2021.

References

External links
 
 
 

1981 births
Living people
Wisła Kraków players
Polish footballers
Poland international footballers
Polish expatriate footballers
Odra Wodzisław Śląski players
Konyaspor footballers
Polonia Warsaw players
Śląsk Wrocław players
Jagiellonia Białystok players
GKS Katowice players
GKS Jastrzębie players
Çaykur Rizespor footballers
Association football goalkeepers
Ekstraklasa players
I liga players
Süper Lig players
TFF First League players
People from Wodzisław Śląski
Sportspeople from Silesian Voivodeship
Polish expatriate sportspeople in Turkey
Expatriate footballers in Turkey